The Dreams in the Witch House and Other Weird Stories is Penguin Classics' third omnibus edition of works by 20th-century American author H. P. Lovecraft. It was released in September 2004 and is still in print.

This edition is the third in Penguin Classics' series of paperback collections. It collects the "definitive" editions of Lovecraft's popular stories as edited by S. T. Joshi.

Its companion volumes from Penguin Classics are The Call of Cthulhu and Other Weird Stories (2001), and The Thing on the Doorstep and Other Weird Stories (2001).

Contents
The Dreams in the Witch House and Other Weird Stories contains the following tales:

 Polaris
 The Doom that Came to Sarnath
 The Terrible Old Man
 The Tree
 The Cats of Ulthar
 From Beyond
 The Nameless City
 The Moon-Bog
 The Other Gods
 Hypnos
 The Lurking Fear
 The Unnamable
 The Shunned House
 The Horror at Red Hook
 In the Vault
 The Strange High House in the Mist
 The Dream-Quest of Unknown Kadath
 The Silver Key
 Through the Gates of the Silver Key
 The Dreams in the Witch House
 The Shadow Out of Time

External links
 Penguin Classics' page for the collection

All of the stories collected in this edition can also be found at Wikisource. Scholars should note that the texts transcribed on Wikisource may contain errors, or may represent "uncorrected" versions.

2004 short story collections
Cthulhu Mythos anthologies
Short story collections by H. P. Lovecraft